The Journal of Blacks in Higher Education is a former academic journal, now an online magazine, for African Americans working in academia in the United States.

The journal was established as a quarterly in 1993 by Theodore Cross, a "champion of civil rights" and the journal's longtime editor-in-chief. The last print issue appeared in 2010. Issues published between 1993 and 2010 are available on JSTOR. However, the magazine still publishes articles on its website. It reports and comments on statistical information pertaining to black students and faculty in the United States. According to Rhonda Sharpe and William Darity  it is "a key resource for publicly consumable statistical reports about the status of blacks in higher education".

Its publisher is headquartered in Bartonsville, Pennsylvania.

References

External links

1993 establishments in the United States
Academic journals published in the United States
African Americans and education
Online magazines published in the United States
Education journals
English-language journals
Monroe County, Pennsylvania
Mass media in Pennsylvania
Publications established in 1993
Quarterly journals